-.- may refer to:

Emoticon, a pictorial representation of a facial expression in characters
In Morse code, the letter K